Scott Amendola (born February 6, 1969) is an American drummer from the San Francisco Bay Area. His styles include jazz, blues, groove, and rock.

Amendola is originally from New Jersey and studied at the Berklee School of Music in Boston. After relocating to California, he rose to popularity in the 1990s as a member of the band T.J. Kirk with Charlie Hunter, Will Bernard, and John Schott. Their second album, If Four Was One, received a Grammy Award nomination. Amendola has led his own bands and trios, which have included musicians such as Nels Cline, Jenny Scheinman, Jeff Parker, John Shifflett, Ben Goldberg, and Devin Hoff. He has recorded with Pat Martino, Jim Campilongo, G.E. Stinson, and Tony Furtado, among others. He is an original member of the Larry Ochs Sax & Drumming Core and has been a session percussionist for Cris Williamson, Noe Venable, Carla Bozulich, and Odessa Chen, to name a few.

In 2011, Amendola premiered his orchestral work Fade to Orange, performed in conjunction with the Oakland East Bay Symphony as one of their New Visions/New Vistas premieres. The drummer was joined by Nels Cline and Trevor Dunn.

Selected discography
with T.J. Kirk
 T.J. Kirk (1995)
 If Four Was One (1996)
 Talking Only Makes It Worse (2003)

with Phillip Greenlief/Scott Amendola Duo
 Collect My Thoughts (1995)

with Pat Martino
 All Sides Now (1997)

with Scott Amendola Band
 Scott Amendola Band (1999)
 Cry (2003)
 Believe (2005)
 Lift (2010)
 Fade to Orange (2015)

with The Nels Cline Singers
 Instrumentals (2000)
 The Giant Pin (2004)
 Draw Breath (2007)
 The Celestial Septet (2010) with Rova Saxophone Quartet
 Initiate (2010)
 Macroscope (2014)

with L. Stinkbug – Nels Cline, G.E. Stinson, Steuart Liebig, Scott Amendola
 The Allure of Roadside Curious (2002)

with Red Pocket – Jewlia Eisenberg, Marika Hughes, Scott Amendola
 Thick (2004)

with Nels Cline
 New Monastery (2006)
 Dirty Baby (2010)

with Plays Monk – Ben Goldberg, Devin Hoff, Scott Amendola
 Plays Monk (2007)

with Bill Frisell
 All Hat (2008)

with Ben Goldberg, Charlie Hunter, Ron Miles
 Go Home (2009)

with Charlie Hunter
 Not Getting Behind Is the New Getting Ahead (2012)
 Pucker (2013)
 Cars/Williams/Porter/Ellington (2014)

with John Dietrich, Ben Goldberg, Scott Amendola
 Short Sighted Dream Colossus (2012)

with Henry Kaiser/Scott Amendola
 Leaps (2015)

with Amendola vs. Blades
 Greatest Hits (2016)

with Invisible Bird – Dave Devine, Shane Endsley, Scott Amendola
 Flutter to Fuzz (2018)

References

External links

 

American jazz drummers
Living people
Place of birth missing (living people)
Singers from California
1969 births
20th-century American drummers
American male drummers
Jazz musicians from California
20th-century American male musicians
American male jazz musicians
21st-century American drummers
The Nels Cline Singers members
21st-century American male singers
21st-century American singers